The W.A. Gayle Planetarium is operated by Troy University for the city of Montgomery, Alabama. It provides public presentations and exhibits on astronomy, planetary science, and space exploration.

Overview 
The W.A. Gayle Planetarium is a planetarium located in Oak Park in the city of Montgomery, Alabama. Dedicated on September 25, 1968, the planetarium is named after William Armistead Gayle, mayor of Montgomery from 1952 to 1959. It is currently operated by Troy University for the City of Montgomery.

Daily public shows typically offer visitors a full-dome movie about a current topic in astronomy and planetary science. Interactive presentations provide a tour of the night sky over Montgomery, pointing out what planets, stars, and constellations can be seen overhead. The 159-seat theater uses a Super MediaGlobe II digital projection system (installed in 2014) to simulate the night sky. Other exhibits include a scale model of the Hubble Space Telescope, images of celestial objects, and a black lit hallway depicting the history of astronomy. The planetarium is currently closed on Saturdays.

References 

Tourist attractions in Montgomery, Alabama
Planetaria
Troy University